Richard Battley (1770–1856), was an English chemist.

Life 
Battley was the son of an architect in Wakefield, where he was born about 1770. He was educated at the Wakefield Grammar School, and after serving as pupil with a physician in Wakefield was appointed medical attendant in connection with the collieries in the district of Newcastle upon Tyne. He then went to London to attend the medical schools, and after concluding his studies entered the service of the Royal Navy as an assistant surgeon, and was present at several engagements under Sir Sidney Smith.

After a few years, however, he returned to London, where he carried on the business of an apothecary, first in St. Paul's Churchyard, and afterwards in Fore Street, Cripplegate. When the London Eye Infirmary was founded, he for a time supplied the medicines free of cost, and also acted as secretary. He introduced many important improvements in pharmaceutical operations, and at his own house in Fore Street, as well as at the Sanderson Institution, providing a museum of materia medica which was open free to the pupils of all the medical schools.

Death 
He died at Reigate on 4 March 1856.

References

1770 births
1856 deaths
18th-century English chemists
19th-century English chemists

People from Wakefield